Light skin is a human skin color that has a base level of eumelanin pigmentation that has adapted to environments of low UV radiation. Light skin is most commonly found amongst the native populations of Europe and Northeast Asia as measured through skin reflectance. People with light skin pigmentation are often referred to as "white" or "fair", although these usages can be ambiguous in some countries where they are used to refer specifically to certain ethnic groups or populations.

As populations migrated away from the tropics into areas of low UV radiation, they developed light skin pigmentation as an evolutionary selection acting against vitamin D depletion.

Humans with light skin pigmentation have skin with low amounts of eumelanin, and possess fewer melanosomes than humans with dark skin pigmentation. Light skin provides better absorption qualities of ultraviolet radiation. This helps the body to synthesize higher amounts of vitamin D for bodily processes such as calcium development. Light-skinned people who live near the equator with high sunlight are at an increased risk of folate depletion. As a consequence of folate depletion, they are at a higher risk of DNA damage, birth defects, and numerous types of cancers, especially skin cancer. Humans with darker skin who live further from the tropics have low vitamin D levels, which also can lead to health complications, both physical and mental, including a greater risk of developing schizophrenia.

The distribution of light-skinned populations is highly correlated with the low ultraviolet radiation levels of the regions inhabited by them. Historically, light-skinned populations almost exclusively lived far from the equator, in high latitude areas with low sunlight intensity. Due to colonization, imperialism, and increased mobility of people between geographical regions in recent centuries, light-skinned populations today are found all over the world.

Evolution

It is generally accepted that dark skin evolved as a protection against the effect of UV radiation; eumelanin protects against both folate depletion and direct damage to DNA. This accounts for the dark skin pigmentation of Homo sapiens during their development in Africa; the major migrations out of Africa to colonize the rest of the world were also dark-skinned. It is widely supposed that light skin pigmentation developed due to the importance of maintaining vitamin D3 production in the skin. Strong selective pressure would be expected for the evolution of light skin in areas of low UV radiation.

Lighter skin tones evolved independently in ancestral populations of north-west and north-east Eurasia, with the two populations diverging around 40,000 years ago. Studies have suggested that the two genes most associated with lighter skin colour in modern Europeans originated in the Middle East and the Caucasus about 22,000 to 28,000 years ago, and were present in Anatolia by 9,000 years ago, where their carriers became associated with the Neolithic Revolution and the spread of Neolithic farming across Europe. Lighter skin and blond hair also evolved in the Ancient North Eurasian population.

A further wave of lighter-skinned populations across Europe (and elsewhere) is associated with the Yamnaya culture and the Indo-European migrations bearing Ancient North Eurasian ancestry and the KITLG allele for blond hair. Furthermore, the SLC24A5 gene linked with light pigmentation in Europeans was introduced into East Africa from Europe over five thousand years ago. These alleles can now be found in the San, Ethiopians, and Tanzanian populations with Afro-Asiatic ancestry. In the San people, it was acquired from interactions with Eastern African pastoralists. Meanwhile, in the case of north-east Asia and the Americas, a variation of the MFSD12 gene is responsible for lighter skin colour. The modern association between skin tone and latitude is thus a relatively recent development.

Geographic distribution; ultraviolet and vitamin D

 

 
In the 1960s, biochemist W. Farnsworth Loomis suggested that skin colour is related to the body's need for vitamin D. The major positive effect of UV radiation in land-living vertebrates is the ability to synthesize vitamin D3 from it. A certain amount of vitamin D helps the body to absorb more calcium which is essential for building and maintaining bones, especially for developing embryos. Vitamin D production depends on exposure to sunlight. Humans living at latitudes far from the equator developed light skin in order to help absorb more vitamin D. People with light (type II) skin can produce previtamin D3 in their skin at rates 5–10 times faster than dark-skinned (type V) people.

In 1998, anthropologist Nina Jablonski and her husband George Chaplin collected spectrometer data to measure UV radiation levels around the world and compared it to published information on the skin color of indigenous populations of more than 50 countries. The results showed a very high correlation between UV radiation and skin color; the weaker the sunlight was in a geographic region, the lighter the indigenous people's skin tended to be. Jablonski points out that people living above the latitudes of 50 degrees have the highest chance of developing vitamin D deficiency. She suggests that people living far from the equator developed light skin to produce adequate amounts of vitamin D during winter with low levels of UV radiation. Genetic studies suggest that light-skinned humans have been selected for multiple times.

Polar regions, vitamin D, and diet

Polar regions of the Northern Hemisphere receive little UV radiation, and even less vitamin D-producing UVB, for most of the year. These regions were uninhabited by humans until about 12,000 years ago. (In northern Fennoscandia at least, human populations arrived soon after deglaciation.) Areas like Scandinavia and Siberia have very low concentrations of ultraviolet radiation, and indigenous populations are all light-skinned.

However, dietary factors may allow vitamin D sufficiency even in dark skinned populations. Many indigenous populations across Eurasia survive by consuming reindeer, which they follow and herd. Reindeer meat, organs, and fat contain large amounts of vitamin D which the reindeer get from eating substantial amounts of lichen. Some people of the polar regions, like the Inuit (Eskimos), retained their dark skin; they ate Vitamin D-rich seafood, such as fish and sea mammal blubber.

Furthermore, these people have been living in the far north for less than 7,000 years. As their founding populations lacked alleles for light skin colour, they may have had insufficient time for significantly lower melanin production to have been selected for by nature. "This was one of the last barriers in the history of human settlement," Jablonski states. "Only after humans learned fishing, and therefore had access to food rich in vitamin D, could they settle regions of high latitude." Additionally, in the spring, Inuit would receive high levels of UV radiation as reflection from the snow, and their relatively darker skin then protects them from the sunlight.

Earlier hypotheses

Two other main hypotheses have been put forward to explain the development of light skin pigmentation: resistance to cold injury, and genetic drift; now both of them are considered unlikely to be the main mechanism behind the evolution of light skin.

The resistance to cold injury hypothesis claimed that dark skin was selected against in cold climates far from the equator and in higher altitudes as dark skin was more affected by frostbite. It has been found that reaction of the skin to extreme cold climates has actually more to do with other aspects, such as the distribution of connective tissue and distribution of fat, and with the responsiveness of peripheral capillaries to differences in temperature, and not with pigmentation.

The supposition that dark skin evolved in the absence of selective pressure was put forward by the probable mutation effect hypothesis. The main factor initiating the development of light skin was seen as a consequence of genetic mutation without an evolutionary selective pressure. The subsequent spread of light skin was thought to be caused by assortive mating and sexual selection contributed to an even lighter pigmentation in females. Doubt has been cast on this hypothesis, as more random patterns of skin coloration would be expected in contrast to the observed structural light skin pigmentation in areas of low UV radiation. The clinal (gradual) distribution of skin pigmentation observable in the Eastern hemisphere, and to a lesser extent in the Western hemisphere, is one of the most significant characteristics of human skin pigmentation. Increasingly lighter skinned populations are distributed across areas with incrementally lower levels of UV radiation.

Genetic associations
Variations in the KITL gene have been positively associated with about 20% of melanin concentration differences between African and non-African populations. One of the alleles of the gene has an 80% occurrence rate in Eurasian populations. The ASIP gene has a 75–80% variation rate among Eurasian populations compared to 20–25% in African populations. Variations in the SLC24A5 gene account for 20–25% of the variation between dark and light skinned populations of Africa, and appear to have arisen as recently as within the last 10,000 years. The Ala111Thr or rs1426654 polymorphism in the coding region of the SLC24A5 gene reaches fixation in Europe, but is found across the globe, particularly among populations in Northern Africa, the Horn of Africa, West Asia, Central Asia and South Asia.

Biochemistry
Melanin is a derivative of the amino acid tyrosine. Eumelanin is the dominant form of melanin found in human skin. Eumelanin protects tissues and DNA from radiation damage by UV light. Melanin is produced in specialized cells called melanocytes, which are found in the lowest level of the epidermis. Melanin is produced inside small membrane-bound packages called melanosomes. Humans with naturally occurring light skin have varied amounts of smaller and sparsely distributed eumelanin and its lighter-coloured relative, pheomelanin. The concentration of pheomelanin varies highly within populations from individual to individual, but it is more commonly found among lightly pigmented Europeans, East Asians, and Native Americans.

For the same body region, individuals, independently of skin colour, have the same amount of melanocytes (however variation between different body parts is substantial), but organelles which contain pigments, called melanosomes, are smaller and less numerous in light-skinned humans.

For people with very light skin, the skin gets most of its colour from the bluish-white connective tissue in the dermis and from the haemoglobin associated blood cells circulating in the capillaries of the dermis. The colour associated with the circulating haemoglobin becomes more obvious, especially in the face, when arterioles dilate and become tumefied with blood as a result of prolonged physical exercise or stimulation of the sympathetic nervous system (usually embarrassment or anger). Up to 50% of UVA can penetrate deeply into the dermis in persons with light skin pigmentation with little protective melanin pigment.

The characteristic of fair skin, red hair, and freckling is associated with high amount of pheomelanin, little amounts of eumelanin. This phenotype is caused by a loss-of-function mutation in the melanocortin 1 receptor (MC1R) gene. However, variations in the MC1R gene sequence only have considerable influence on pigmentation in populations where red hair and extremely fair skin is prevalent. The gene variation's primary effect is to promote eumelanin synthesis at the expense of pheomelanin synthesis, although this contributes to very little variation in skin reflectance between different ethnic groups. Melanocytes from light skin cells cocultured with keratinocytes give rise to a distribution pattern characteristic of light skin.

Freckles usually only occur in people with very lightly pigmented skin. They vary from very dark to brown in colour and develop a random pattern on the skin of the individual. Solar lentigines, the other types of freckles, occur among old people regardless of skin colour. People with very light skin (types I and II) make very little melanin in their melanocytes, and have very little or no ability to produce melanin in the stimulus of UV radiation. This can result in frequent sunburns and a more dangerous, but invisible, damage done to connective tissue and DNA underlying the skin. This can contribute to premature aging and skin cancer. The strongly red appearance of lightly pigmented skin as a response to high UV radiation levels is caused by the increased diameter, number, and blood flow of the capillaries.

People with moderately pigmented skin (Types III-IV) are able to produce melanin in their skin in response to UVR. Normal tanning is usually delayed as it takes time for the melanins to move up in the epidermis. Heavy tanning does not approach the photoprotective effect against UVR-induced DNA damage compared to naturally occurring dark skin, however it offers great protection against seasonal variations in UVR. Gradually developed tan in the spring prevents sunburns in the summer. This mechanism is almost certainly the evolutionary reason behind the development of tanning behaviour.

Health implications
Skin pigmentation is an evolutionary adaptation to the various UV radiation levels around the world. There are health implications of light-skinned people living in environments of high UV radiation. Various cultural practices increase problems related to health conditions of light skin, for example sunbathing among the light-skinned.

Advantages in low sunlight
Humans with light skin pigmentation living in low sunlight environments experience increased vitamin D synthesis compared to humans with dark skin pigmentation due to the ability to absorb more sunlight. Almost every part of the human body, including the skeleton, the immune system, and brain requires vitamin D. Vitamin D production in the skin begins when UV radiation penetrates the skin and interacts with a cholesterol-like molecule produce pre-vitamin D3. This reaction only occurs in the presence of medium length UVR, UVB. Most of the UVB and UVC rays are destroyed or reflected by ozone, oxygen, and dust in the atmosphere. UVB reaches the Earth's surface in the highest amounts when its path is straight and goes through a little layer of atmosphere.

The farther a place is from the equator, the less UVB is received, and the potential to produce of vitamin D is diminished. Some regions far from the equator do not receive UVB radiation at all between autumn and spring. Vitamin D deficiency does not kill its victims quickly, and generally does not kill at all. Rather it weakens the immune system, the bones, and compromises the body's ability to fight uncontrolled cell division which results in cancer. A form of vitamin D is a potent cell growth inhibitor; thus chronic deficiencies of vitamin D seem to be associated with higher risk of certain cancers. This is an active topic of cancer research and is still debated. The vitamin D deficiency associated with dark skin leads to higher levels of schizophrenia in such populations residing in northerly latitudes.

With the increase of vitamin D synthesis, there is a decreased incidence of conditions that are related to common vitamin D deficiency conditions of people with dark skin pigmentation living in environments of low UV radiation: rickets, osteoporosis, numerous cancer types (including colon and breast cancer), and immune system malfunctioning. Vitamin D promotes the production of cathelicidin, which helps to defend humans' bodies against fungal, bacterial, and viral infections, including flu. When exposed to UVB, the entire exposed area of body's skin of a relatively light skinned person is able to produce between 10 and 20000 IU of vitamin D.

Disadvantages in high sunlight

Light-skinned people living in high sunlight environments are more susceptible to the harmful UV rays of sunlight because of the lack of melanin produced in the skin. The most common risk that comes with high exposure to sunlight is the increased risk of sunburns. This increased risk has come along with the cultural practice of sunbathing, which is popular among light-skinned populations. This cultural practice to gain tanned skin if not regulated properly can lead to sunburn, especially among very lightly-skinned humans. The overexposure to sunlight also can lead to basal cell carcinoma, which is a common form of skin cancer.

Another health implication is the depletion of folate within the body, where the overexposure to UV light can lead to megaloblastic anemia. Folate deficiency in pregnant women can be detrimental to the health of their newborn babies in the form of neural tube defects, miscarriages, and spina bifida, a birth defect in which the backbone and spinal canal do not close before birth. The peak of neural tube defect occurrences is the highest in the May–June period in the Northern Hemisphere. Folate is needed for DNA replication in dividing cells and deficiency can lead to failures of normal embryogenesis and spermatogenesis.

Individuals with lightly pigmented skin who are repeatedly exposed to strong UV radiation, experience faster aging of the skin, which shows in increased wrinkling and anomalies of pigmentation. Oxidative damage causes the degradation of protective tissue in the dermis, which confers the strength of the skin. It has been postulated that white women may develop wrinkles faster after menopause than black women because they are more susceptible to the lifetime damage of the sun throughout life. Dr. Hugh S. Taylor, of Yale School of Medicine, concluded that the study could not prove the findings but they suspect the underlying cause. Light-coloured skin has been suspected to be one of the contributing factors that promote wrinkling.

See also

White people
Dark skin
Olive skin
High yellow
Skin whitening
Albinism
Blond
Red hair
Albinism in humans

References

 
Skin pigmentation